Next is the fifth studio album by American rock band Sevendust. It was released on October 11, 2005, a little over two years after their previous album, Seasons.

Track listing

Personnel 
Sevendust
 Lajon Witherspoon – lead vocals
 John Connolly – lead guitar, backing vocals
 Sonny Mayo – rhythm guitar
 Vinnie Hornsby – bass
 Morgan Rose – drums, backing vocals

Production
John Connolly – producer, mixing
Eddie Gowan – executive producer
Shawn Grove – producer, engineer, mixing
Joe Miller – executive producer
Shilpa Patel – digital editing
Morgan Rose – producer, mixing
Eddy Schreyer – mastering
Sevendust – co-producer
Viggy Vignola – programming and drum technician

Chart positions

Album

Singles

References 

Sevendust albums
2005 albums